Double Cross, Double Crossed, or their variants may refer to:

Art, entertainment, and media

Heraldic 

 Two-barred cross (‡)

Comics
 Double Cross, an issue of Buffy the Vampire Slayer collected in Food Chain
 Double Cross!, a comic by Tony Consiglio

Fictional entities
 The "Double-Cross" (of betrayal), the emblem of Hynkel's fascist regime in Charlie Chaplin's comedy film The Great Dictator (1940)

Film 
 Double Cross, an installment of the 1940 Mysterious Doctor Satan film serial
 Double Cross (1941 film), a film by Albert H. Kelley
 Double Cross (1951 film), a film by Riccardo Freda
 Double Cross (1972 film), a Bollywood action film
 Double Cross (1992 film), a Japanese crime film also released under the title The Triple Cross
 Double Cross (2005 film), a Bollywood film
 Double Cross (2006 film), a television film, starring Yancy Butler and Bruce Boxleitner
 Double-Cross (2014 film), a Ghanaian film
 Doublecross (1956 film), a film featuring Allan Cuthbertson
 Doublecrossed (1991), HBO television film about Barry Seal, starring Dennis Hopper

Games
 Double Cross, a segment game from The Price is Right
 Double Cross (video game), a 2019 video game developed by 13AM Games

Literature
 Double Cross (novel), a 2007 novel by James Patterson
 Double Cross, a novel in the Noughts and Crosses series by Malorie Blackman

Music
 Double Cross (album), a 1968 album by Hank Crawford
 The Double Cross, a 2011 album by Sloan
 The Double-Cross, an album by Tempest

Television
 "Double Cross" (Sliders), an episode of Sliders
 "Double-Cross" (CSI), an episode of CSI

Other uses 
 Double cross (betrayal)
 Double cross stitch, a type of cross stitch embroidery
 Double Cross System, a Second World War counterespionage and deception operation of MI5
 Double Cross Vodka, a vodka originating from the Slovak Republic

See also 
 Coat of arms of Hungary
 Coat of arms of Lithuania
 Coat of arms of Slovakia
 Cross of Lorraine, a two-barred cross associated with the Free French during World War II
 Dagger (mark) (‡) or double dagger
 Patriarchal cross, a two-barred variant of the Christian cross, especially in the Eastern Orthodox Church